Shanghai Lady is a 1929 American drama film directed by John S. Robertson and written by Houston Branch and Winnifred Reeve. It is based on the 1910 play Drifting by John Colton and Daisy H. Andrews. The film stars Mary Nolan, James Murray, Lydia Yeamans Titus, Wheeler Oakman, Anders Randolf, and Yola d'Avril. The film was released on November 17, 1929, by Universal Pictures.

Cast        
Mary Nolan as Cassie Cook
James Murray as 'Badlands' McKinney
Lydia Yeamans Titus as Polly Voo
Wheeler Oakman as Repen
Anders Randolf as Mandarin
Yola d'Avril as Lizzie
Mona Rico as Rose
James B. Leong as Counselor
Irma Lowe as Golden Almond

References

External links
 

1929 films
1920s English-language films
American drama films
1929 drama films
Universal Pictures films
Films directed by John S. Robertson
American black-and-white films
1920s American films